La Hora de María y el pájaro de oro is a 1975 Argentine film.

It received its premiere on August 28, 1975. It was filmed in Eastmancolor in the cities of Corrientes, Empedrado, Goya and Mercedes. It was directed by Rodolfo Kuhn, with a script by Eduardo Gudiño Kieffer. It is about a young peasant woman and her son who is a prisoner of the golden bird.

Cast

  Leonor Manso
  Dora Baret
  Arturo Puig
  Jorge Rivera López
  Martín Deiros
  Marta Albertini
  Milagros de la Vega
  Sara Bonet
  Inés Ruiz
  Maruja Pibernat
  Nolo Arias
  Ramón Machuca
  Gregoria Miño
  Claudio Casas
  Chelda Arrieu
  Marta Arrieu

References

External links
 
La Hora de María y el pájaro de oro. FilmAffinity

1975 films
Argentine drama films
1970s Spanish-language films
Films directed by Rodolfo Kuhn
1970s Argentine films